Quinlan may refer to:

 Quinlan (name), including a list of people with the name
 Quinlan, Texas

See also
 Quinlan Opera Company
 Quinlan Road, a record label